, known as Spaceketeers in the United States, is an anime series produced by Toei Animation. It is a sci-fi remake/adaptation of Wu Cheng'en's fantasy novel Journey to the West. It was directed by Yugo Serikawa and written by Leiji Matsumoto. It aired in Fuji TV in Japan from April 2, 1978, to August 24, 1979. In the United States, it was referred to as Spaceketeers and was part of Jim Terry's Force Five series. In the United Kingdom, it was referred to as Sci-Bots on VHS releases. In Latin America, it was known as El Galáctico.

Story
The story revolves around the Princess of the Moon, Aurora and her three cyborg companions (Kugo, Djorgo, and Hakka) who must travel to the Great King planet and restore the Galaxy Energy in the year 2072. The universe was becoming more and more unbalanced as the Queen of the Great Planet grows older. Their adventure includes battling the starmen who are transformed from the unbalanced minerals and planets.

Concept
Starzinger was essentially a sci-fi space opera retelling of the 16th-century shenmo fantasy novel Journey to the West, a Chinese literary classic written by the Ming dynasty novelist Wu Cheng'en. The sci-fi twists were designed by Leiji Matsumoto based on the Terebi Magazine manga with art by Gosaku Ohta.

Characters

Production
The series was produced by Toei Animation. Production staff include:
 Directors: Yugo Seirikawa, Kozo Morishita, Kazumi Fukushima
 Creator: Leiji Matsumoto
 Screenwriters: Tatsuo Tamura, Mitsuru Majima, Sukehiro Tomita
 Character Designs: Masami Suda
 Animators: Masami Suda, Satoshi Jinguu
 Music: Shunsuke Kikuchi

Adaptations
In March 1979, a movie was aired reusing footage from the first segment of the series. The movie was more or less a summary.

The last nine episodes of the actual series was re-branded as "SF Saiyūki Starzinger II", though when shown outside Japan it was treated as one continuous series. It was never intended to be anything more than re-marketing of the last few episodes, since it was aired immediately after the first sixty-four episodes were shown in June 1979. The 65th episode began instantly in July 1979 with all the galactic energy restored in the storyline.

Media

A total of 73 episodes of Sci-Fi West Saga Starzinger were broadcast in Japan.

Starzinger was aired in the early 1980s in Latin America under the name of El Galáctico (The Galactic), as part of the four-series show "El festival de los robots", which translates to "The festival of the robots". The other shows were "Steel Jeeg", "Gaiking", and "Magne Robo Gakeen". Only 47 episodes of the original 73 were dubbed and aired. This version of the series never reached their conclusion. The Spanish theme song of "El Galáctico" was composed and sung by Chilean singer Memo Aguirre (Capitán Memo). In 2008 the Chilean company SeriesTV edit a set of 24 DVD with Festival de los Robots episodes. This set includes 24 episodes of "El Galactico" with the original Spanish dubbing.

In North America, it was aired as "Spaceketeers" as part of the package show Force Five. As the Journey to the West story is not well known in the region, the characters were renamed to reference the Three Musketeers. To also fit into the Force Five time slot, the show had to be edit-squeezed into 26 episodes. The U.S. version puts them on a mission to the Dekos Star System, which contained evil powers changing peaceful creatures to evil mutants. The Force Five version not only just produced 26 episodes, but this English-language version of the series never reached their conclusion.

Twenty-four episodes of the original 73 also aired in Scandinavia (mainly in Sweden) under the original name Starzinger. A listing of what episodes were cut out can be found at: Warfists Starzinger site in the episode section. The Swedish-language version of the series reached their conclusion.

Episode list

Home Media

VHS

United Kingdom:

DVD

Japan: On 25 January 2008 TOHO released a six disc DVD box-set.

Latin America: On 28 July 2008 SeriesTv released "El Festival de los Robots" onto DVD.

USA: On 20 August 2013 Shout! Factory released "Starzinger: The Movie Collection" onto DVD.

References

External links
 Official page of Starzinger I
 Review of Sci-Bots
 
 

1978 anime television series debuts
1979 Japanese television series endings
1979 anime films
1979 manga
Action anime and manga
Fictional kings
Fictional princes
Fictional princesses
Fictional queens
Fuji TV original programming
Japanese animated science fiction films
Manga series
Television series set in the 2070s
Television series set in the future
Works based on Journey to the West
Animated space adventure television series
Toei Animation television
Toei Animation films
1970s Japanese television series